A civil air ensign is a flag (or a variation thereof) which represents civil aviation in a country or organization. Typically, it is flown from buildings connected with the administration of civil aviation and it may also be flown by airlines of the appropriate country. A civil air ensign is the equivalent of the civil ensign which represents merchant shipping.  Not all countries have civil air ensigns and those without usually fly their national flags instead.

List of civil air ensigns

Countries

Organizations

List of former civil air ensigns

References